Rabbit Island is one of the Falkland Islands in the Hummock Island group. It is near West Falkland, to its west, at the mouth of King George Bay. With a land area of  square miles (1.78 km2)  it is the second largest of the three main islands in the bay, lying 2.8 miles (4.5 km) west of  Hummock Island and Middle Island. It is east of the Passage Islands and south east of Split Island.

On three sides the island is roughly rectangular, but there is a long promontory extending to the south-east. It was heavily grazed by sheep in the past and there is an old shanty in the valley. Rats have been confirmed on the island.

References

Islands of the Falkland Islands